Gerrit Nagels (7 April 1906 – 26 February 1950) was a Dutch footballer. He played in three matches for the Netherlands national football team from 1928 to 1933.

References

External links
 

1906 births
1950 deaths
Dutch footballers
Netherlands international footballers
Place of birth missing
Association footballers not categorized by position